The Koasek Abenaki Tribe is a state-recognized tribe in Vermont, who claim descent from Abenaki people.

They are not federally recognized as a Native American tribe. Vermont does not have any federally recognized Native American tribes.

This organization should not be confused with the Ko'asek (Co'wasuck) Traditional Band of the Sovereign Abenaki Nation, an unrecognized tribe based in New Hampshire.

Name 
The term Koasek is an Abenaki language term that translates as "young pine tree."

State-recognition 
Vermont recognized the Koasek Abenaki Tribe as in 2012. The other state-recognized tribes in Vermont are the Nulhegan Band of the Coosuk Abenaki Nation, Elnu Abenaki Tribe, and the Mississquoi Abenaki Tribe.

Heritage 
The Koasek Abenaki Tribe are one of four state-recognized tribes in Vermont. They had 60 members in 2016.

St. Mary's University associate professor Darryl Leroux's genealogical and historical research found that the  members of this and the other three state-recognized tribes in Vermont were composed primarily of "French descendants who have used long-ago ancestry in New France to shift into an 'Abenaki' identity."

In 2002, the State of Vermont reported that the Abenaki people had migrated north to Quebec by the end of the 17th century.

Activities 
They participate in Abenaki Heritage Weekend, held at the Lake Champlain Maritime Museum in Vergennes, Vermont.

Property tax 
Vermont H.556, "An act relating to exempting property owned by Vermont-recognized Native American tribes from property tax," passed on April 20, 2022.

Notable members 
 Billy Kidd, former alpine ski racer

Notes

References

External links
 Koasek Traditional Band of the Koas Abenaki Nation
 Vermont Commission on Native American Affairs

Abenaki heritage groups
Cultural organizations based in Vermont
French American
Native American tribes in Vermont
State-recognized tribes in the United States